The Ministry of Mining is the government ministry of United Republic of Tanzania that is responsible for facilitating the development of the Mining sectors as separated with the Ministry of Energy during the mini-reshuffle to the Cabinet done by the President of the United Republic of Tanzania, John Pombe Magufuli.

References

External links 

Mining
Ministries established in 1962
1962 establishments in Tanzania
Mining in Tanzania